Race to Witch Mountain is a 2009 American science fiction adventure thriller film directed by Andy Fickman, starring Dwayne Johnson in the lead role, with AnnaSophia Robb, Alexander Ludwig, Ciarán Hinds, and Carla Gugino. The latest in a series of Witch Mountain pictures, the film was a box office success.

Plot 
An alien spacecraft crashes near Searchlight, Nevada, 45 miles outside of Las Vegas. Project Moon Dust, a secret Defense Department unit led by Henry Burke, arrive at the scene of the crash in black helicopters. Men in black seize the spaceship and search for its passengers with the intention of harnessing their DNA and powers.

Back in Vegas, former mob getaway driver Jack Bruno works as a taxi cab driver to avoid returning to jail. One of his passengers is Dr. Alex Friedman, a failed astrophysicist who has come to Vegas to speak at a UFO convention at the Planet Hollywood hotel.

After fending off two thugs who seek his services for a mob boss named Andrew Wolfe, Bruno finds two teenagers, Sara and Seth, in his cab. They offer $15,000 to drive them to an unknown destination. Burke's men track down the teenagers (who turn out to be the spaceship's passengers) through various discoveries such as stolen clothes, a car being burglarized, a bus leading to Las Vegas, and an ATM being deprived of all of its contents, which eventually pinpoints their location in Bruno's taxi. They engage Bruno in a high-speed chase. Mistaking the government agents for more mob thugs, he tries to evade them with his driving skills. Seth's ability to vary his molecular density, as well as Sara's telepathy and telekinesis, helps the group to escape.

When they arrive at an abandoned house, Bruno follows them out of concern and curiosity. The teenagers retrieve the device they were looking for within a hidden underground laboratory, but the three are attacked by the "Siphon", a powerful armored alien assassin. The Siphon pursues the group until its spaceship crashes into a train and the creature is wounded. After Seth and Sara prove their otherworldly biology to Bruno, the three settle at a diner to calm their nerves, only to be tracked by and escape from Burke's agents again.

Bruno brings Seth and Sara to Dr. Friedman at the UFO convention. Despite initially dismissing Bruno's story, she believes him after Seth and Sara show off their powers and narrate their current situation: they are aliens from a dying planet located 3,000 light years from Earth and are able to travel by using wormholes on their spaceships. Its government intends to invade Earth, despite the majority of their race being fully opposed to the plan, so that their kind may survive. Seth and Sara's parents are scientists who sought a way to save their planet without invasion, but were arrested before completing their experiment. The teenagers came to retrieve the successful results, but the alien government (who still have their sights on invading Earth rather than trying to save their home planet) sent the Siphon to stop them. To save both worlds, they must retrieve their spaceship and return home with the results in order to prevent the invasion from happening.

Friedman then realizes that the teenagers are what she has been searching for and joins the group. They meet fellow UFOlogist and conspiracy theorist Dr. Donald Harlan, who tells them that the spaceship was taken to the secret US government base named Witch Mountain. Harlan and his men distract the soldiers with Bruno's taxi while the others escape to Witch Mountain in Harlan's RV after evading the Siphon. The group arrives at the base, but are captured by Burke. He orders that the teenagers be prepared for vivisection, but frees the adults, confident that nobody will believe them.

The Siphon attacks Witch Mountain and engages the soldiers, allowing Bruno and Friedman to infiltrate the base and free Seth and Sara. They launch the ship, escape through the mountain's tunnels, and finally kill The Siphon, who has stowed away on the spaceship. The teenagers give Bruno and Friedman a tracking device that will allow the aliens to always find them. They tearfully wish them farewell, but not before Sara gives her telepathic powers to Bruno.

Some weeks later, Bruno and Friedman become successful authors of a book named Race to Witch Mountain: A True Story. They promote their book and knowledge on the UFO convention circuit, explaining that the publicity protects them from government reprisal. As they leave the convention, the alien device activates, implying that the alien teenagers may be returning to Earth.

Cast 
 Dwayne Johnson as Jack Bruno, who is a Las Vegas cab driver and a former convict. The director wrote in a cab driver as a main character because there was a unique relationship between the driver and his passengers. Fickman explained: "When Dwayne's driving and two aliens appear in his cab, he's stuck with them, there is an implied contract that I will get you to your destination, because that's what he does". This is Johnson's second Disney film, following the 2007 family comedy film The Game Plan, also directed by Andy Fickman.
 AnnaSophia Robb as Sara, sister of Seth, a girl with telekinetic and telepathic powers. Fickman chose Robb based on her performance as Leslie Burke in Bridge to Terabithia. She is kind to Bruno and is the more compassionate of the two siblings. The only time she does not refer to Jack by his full name (Jack Bruno) is when she says goodbye to him, when she refers to him only as "Jack".
 Alexander Ludwig as Seth, brother of Sara, a boy with the power to control his molecular density – "phasing" to become very dense, evidently giving him some degree of invulnerability, or become insubstantial and pass through solid objects. He is very cold to Bruno at first, not trusting him very much, but apologizes in the end saying that if it were not for him they would have not finished their mission. Both siblings talk using overly formal, emotionless, and analytical voices, and are always addressing Bruno by both his first and last name in all situations.
 Carla Gugino as Dr. Alex Friedman, a discredited astrophysicist. Fired from her university, she is relegated to giving a lecture at a UFO conference about hard science. She becomes Jack's love interest. Fickman cast Gugino in the role as he was a fan of the short-lived television series Threshold, in which the actress starred.
 Ciarán Hinds as Henry Burke, the leader of Project Moon Dust. Sarcastic and unscrupulous, he has no regard for morality, as demonstrated after Seth and Sara are imprisoned in Witch Mountain when he orders them to be experimented on so he can harness their powers, regardless of the possibility that they could die. As long as he gets results, whether they live or die does not matter to him. Hinds described his character as a man in black, explaining, "I'm the head of the operation who's contacted directly by a man you never see...[It] is about protecting the country. He's responsible for it, and he'll do whatever needs to be done. That's how he sees it".
 Tom Woodruff Jr. as the Siphon, a well-trained alien assassin.
 Garry Marshall as Dr. Donald Harlan, a friend of Alex's and author of UFO-related books, who thinks he can "tell when people are lying to me". He is seen tricking Burke into going after him by trading cars with Jack.
 Tom Everett Scott as Mr. Matheson, a government agent working for Burke. 
 Cheech Marin as Eddie Cortez, the auto mechanic who gets frustrated when people come to his shop in the middle of the night, when it is closed.
 Chris Marquette as Pope, one of Burke's agents.
 Eva Huang as Shira the UFO Huntress 
 Billy Brown as Mr. Carson
 Dennis Hayden as Ray
 William J. Birnes, the host of UFO Hunters, in a cameo.
 Whitley Strieber, author of Communion, in a cameo.
Kim Richards and Ike Eisenmann, who portrayed Tia and Tony in the original Witch Mountain films of the 1970s, made cameo appearances in Race to Witch Mountain. Richards appears as a roadhouse waitress (named "Tina", a minor change from the character [Tia] she played in the 1975 and 1978 films) and Eisenmann appears as Sheriff Anthony (a reference to his character [Tony] from the previous films). Meredith Salenger, the star of Disney's 1985 adventure The Journey of Natty Gann has a cameo as a TV reporter named "Natalie Gann".

Production 
Development of an Escape to Witch Mountain remake was announced in April 2001, with writing duties handed to Adam Kulakow. In July 2007, Walt Disney Pictures hired Andy Fickman to direct Witch Mountain, a "modern re-imagining" of Escape to Witch Mountain, using a script by Matt Lopez. The following August, Dwayne Johnson (most notably famous for portraying The Rock in the WWE) was cast into a lead role, with filming scheduled to begin in March 2008. Fickman did not describe the film as a remake, defining his production as "a new chapter within the world of Witch Mountain". The director also described the book, the original source of the films, as "a very cool dark thriller" and anticipated drawing elements from it that did not exist in the 1975 film. By March 2008 filmmakers were using a new script written by Mark Bomback: now re-titled Race to Witch Mountain, filming began in Los Angeles the same month.

The convention center in Pomona, California was converted into the film's UFO Expo 9, and the interior of Witch Mountain was designed using photographs from a tour of NORAD's Cheyenne Mountain Complex. A cabin for the story was also built in Agua Dulce, California. The director sought assistance from UFO experts, the military, and CIA advisers to shape the elements of the film. He also introduced a new element in the remake, an extraterrestrial creature called Siphon. The creature was conceived by the design team who created the looks for Alien and Predator in the film Alien vs. Predator.

Music 
The Offspring song "Stuff is Messed Up" and Future World Music song "Heart Of Fury" were used in promos for the movie. The score to Race to Witch Mountain was composed by Trevor Rabin, who recorded his score with a 78-piece ensemble of the Hollywood Studio Symphony and a 24-person choir at the Sony Scoring Stage. Two of the songs in the film were written and performed by country and western band Brokedown Cadillac, which appears briefly in an opening scene.

The film also features the hit single "Fly on the Wall" by Miley Cyrus and "Emergency" by Hollywood Records artist Steve Rushton, on the soundtrack.

Home media 
Race to Witch Mountain was released August 4, 2009 in three different sets: a single disc wide-screen DVD with no bonus features; a deluxe DVD edition with bonus content; and a Blu-ray release of the deluxe edition.

Reception

Critical response 
Review aggregation website Rotten Tomatoes reports a 42% rating based on 153 reviews, and an average rating of 5.1/10. The website's critical consensus reads: "Despite the best efforts of a talented cast, Race to Witch Mountain is a tepid reboot that lacks the magic of the original". On Metacritic, the film has a score of 52 out of 100, based on 28 critics, indicating "mixed or average reviews". Audiences polled by CinemaScore gave the film an average grade of "B+" on an A+ to F scale.

Box office 
The film was a box office hit. It became the first Disney film in 2009 to open at #1, grossing $24.4 million. The film went on to gross over $67 million at the North American domestic box office, and over $39 million internationally, for a worldwide total of $106 million.

References

External links 
 
 
 
 

2009 films
American children's films
American children's adventure films
Walt Disney Pictures films
2000s children's films
2000s mystery films
American science fiction adventure films
2000s science fiction adventure films
Disney film remakes
Films directed by Andy Fickman
Films set in California
Films set in Nevada
Films set in the Las Vegas Valley
Witch Mountain films
Films scored by Trevor Rabin
Films with screenplays by Mark Bomback
American science fiction thriller films
Films about telekinesis
Films about taxis
Witch Mountain (franchise)
2000s English-language films
2000s American films